The Rippling Wall is a 2014 outdoor aluminum sculpture by David Franklin, installed on the facade of Portland Fire & Rescue Station 21 in Portland, Oregon's Buckman neighborhood, in the United States.

Description and history
The Rippling Wall, designed by David Franklin, is installed on the facade of Portland Fire & Rescue Station 21 at 5 Southeast Madison Street on the east bank of the Willamette River. It is administered by the Regional Arts & Culture Council.

Reception
In 2015, the work was one of three 2014 public art projects in the city, and 31 in the United States, recognized by Americans for the Arts as among the best in the country.

See also

 2014 in art

References

External links
 The Rippling Wall at David Franklin's official website
 Rippling Wall Receives Public Art Network Year in Review Award (June 13, 2015) at David Franklin's official website

2014 establishments in Oregon
2014 sculptures
Aluminum sculptures in Oregon
Buckman, Portland, Oregon
Outdoor sculptures in Portland, Oregon